Rear Admiral Frederick Lois Riefkohl (February 27, 1889 – September 1969), a native of Maunabo, Puerto Rico, was an officer in the United States Navy  and the first Puerto Rican to graduate from the United States Naval Academy and to be awarded the Navy Cross. The Navy Cross is the second highest medal, after the Medal of Honor, that can be awarded by the U.S. Navy for heroism or distinguished service. He was a World War I Navy Cross recipient who served as Captain of the USS Vincennes during World War II.

Early years
Riefkohl (birth name: Luis Federico Riefkohl Jaimieson), was born and raised in Maunabo, Puerto Rico, his father was Luis A. Riefkohl y Sandoz, a Puerto Rican native and his mother and Julia Ana Jamieson (or Jamielson), a native of Saint Thomas, U.S. Virgin Islands. 
His paternal grandfather was Otto Riefkohl, a native of Germany and his paternal grandmother was Luisa Sandoz, a native of Switzerland who had immigrated to Puerto Rico in the mid-1800s.
His older brother was Rudolph W. Riefkohl, who during World War I played an instrumental role in helping the people of Poland overcome the 1919 typhus epidemic. Rudolph eventually became a Colonel in the United States Army Corps of Engineers. His other siblings were his sisters, Helen, Emily and Louise Riefkohl.

During his formative years, Luis Federico Riefkohl received his primary and secondary education in various places. These included the towns of Arroyo, Puerto Rico; Christainsted, St. Croix, U.S. Virgin Islands and he spent three and a half years at Phillips Andover Academy in Boston, Massachusetts. Riefkohl received an appointment on July 5, 1907, from Beekman Winthrop, the U.S. appointed Governor of Puerto Rico from 1904 to 1907, to attend the United States Naval Academy in Annapolis, Maryland. In 1911, he became the first Puerto Rican to graduate from the Academy.

During World War I, Lieutenant Riefkohl served as Commander of the Armed Guard of the USS Philadelphia and on August 2, 1917, he was awarded the Navy Cross for engaging an enemy submarine. The Navy Cross is the second highest medal that can be awarded by the U.S. Navy and is awarded to members of the U.S. Navy or U.S. Marine Corps for heroism or distinguished service.

Navy Cross citation

Pre-World War II
Riefkohl was reassigned to the Fifteenth Naval District, Balboa, Canal Zone as District Communication Officer. From 1920 to 1923, he served in various ships and in different administrative positions, among which were Squadron Radio Officer for Destroyer Squadron 3, Atlantic Fleet; Aide and Force Radio Officer on the Staff of Commander Destroyer Force, Atlantic Fleet and Executive Officer of the USS Preble en route to the Asiatic Station. From August 1922 until October 1923, Riefkohl served as Aide and Flag Secretary and Fleet Radio and Communication Officer to the Commander in Chief of the Asiatic Fleet.

From July 1926 to August 1928, he assumed the command of the destroyer USS Corry. He returned to the Brooklyn Navy Yard in New York City, after a naval tour which included the ports of Port-au-Prince, Haiti; Guantanamo Bay, Cuba; San Juan, Puerto Rico; and St. Thomas, U.S. Virgin Islands. He served as Executive Officer of the USS Kittery until June 1929. Riefkohl served as Chief of Staff to the governor of the Virgin Islands until April 30, 1931, when he was named Commandant of the islands Naval Station. He continued to serve in various ships until he was placed in charge of the Navy Motion Picture Exchange, Brooklyn Navy Yard, New York, during his senior year at the Naval War College. From January 1935 to December 1936 he served as an adviser to the Argentine Navy Department at Buenos Aires, Argentina. From July 19, 1939 until April 4, 1941, Riefkohl served as War Plans Officer on the staff of the Commandant Fifteenth Naval District, Balboa, Canal Zone.

World War II

Riefkohl assumed command of the USS Vincennes on April 23, 1941. The USS Vincennes was in the Atlantic Ocean when the U.S. entered World War II and escorted the aircraft carrier USS Hornet to the Pacific.  The Vincennes was among the cruiser escorts for Hornet and USS Enterprise which were involved with the Doolittle Raids on Tokyo and which later participated in the Battle of Midway.

Riefkohl's ship participated in Guadalcanal operation and was assigned to the Fire Support Group, LOVE (with Transport Group XRAY) under the command of Rear Admiral Richmond K. Turner's Task Force TARE (Amphibious Force). Rear Admiral Turner group was preparing for the Guadalcanal landing which began on August 7, 1942. The USS Vincennes belonged to Task Group 62.2, which screened the landings to the west of the assembled transports unloading on Guadalcanal and Tulagi. Rear Admiral Victor A. Crutchley commanded six allied cruisers, plus a small number of destroyers and minesweepers and split the force into a Northern Force (USS Vincennes, and ) and a Southern Force (HMAS Australia, HMAS Canberra, and )

On August 9, 1942, Rear Admiral Crutchley and his flagship went to meet Rear Admiral Richmond K Turner, in command of the amphibious force, without notifying Riefkohl.

The Japanese Admiral Gunichi Mikawa of the Japanese Navy decided to make a surprise attack on the American ships, leading to the Battle of Savo Island. He first destroyed an Australian cruiser, then damaged the USS Chicago before going after the USS Vincennes. Riefkohl was summoned up to the bridge and believed that a minor skirmish was taking place with a ship. When the Japanese ships turned on their searchlights, Riefkohl mistook them for the American ships from the Southern Force and asked them over the radio to turn off their lights because enemy vessels might be near. The Japanese answered the message with a fusillade of shells and torpedoes.

Riefkohl ordered a starboard turn, but the torpedoes hit and exploded, destroying both engine rooms. The USS Vincennes fired back and may have hit the Kinugasa, a Japanese cruiser. The Vincennes received 85 direct hits and Riefkohl ordered his men to abandon the ship. The sailors manned the life rafts and the Vincennes rolled over and sank with 342 men still aboard. Riefkohl was presented a Purple Heart for the wounds which he received.

HMAS Canberra, USS Vincennes, USS Quincy, and USS Astoria sank and the USS Chicago was badly damaged in the battle. However, despite their losses they had successfully screened the amphibious ships that were still unloading to the east.

Later years
Riefkohl never commanded a United States Naval vessel again. In October 1942, he reported to the Office of the US Attache, American Embassy, Mexico City in Mexico, and joined the staff of the Commander, Mexican Forces, Region Gulf of Mexico, at Vera Cruz, as Liaison Officer for the US Commander, Gulf Sea Frontier. Throughout the remaining war years, Riefkohl served in different administrative positions, among them District Intelligence Officer, Eighth Naval District, with headquarters at New Orleans, Louisiana.

Later years
Rear Admiral Frederick Lois Riefkohl later served as the Chief of Staff to the governor of the U.S. Virgin Islands, advisor to the Argentine Navy and as Inspector of the 10th Naval District in San Juan, Puerto Rico until his retirement from the Navy on January 1, 1947.  Rear Admiral Frederick Lois Riefkohl died in Brevard County, Florida in 1969, and was buried with full military honors in the United States Naval Academy Cemetery. He was married to Louisa Gibson Riefkohl (1902–1974) and did not have any offspring.

Awards and recognitions
Among Rear Admiral Frederick Lois Riefkohl's decorations and medals were the following:

See also

Hispanic Admirals in the United States Navy
List of Puerto Ricans
Puerto Ricans in World War I
Puerto Ricans in World War II
List of Puerto Rican military personnel
German immigration to Puerto Rico
Puerto Rican recipients of the Navy Cross
Hispanics in the United States Navy
Hispanics in the United States Naval Academy

Notes

References

Further reading
Puertorriquenos Who Served With Guts, Glory, and Honor. Fighting to Defend a Nation Not Completely Their Own; by : Greg Boudonck; 
The Future of the Enterprise; by Marius S. Vassiliou and David S. Alberts; 
The Conquering Tide: War in the Pacific Islands, 1942-1944; By Ian W. Toll;

External links
 World War II plus 55
Riefkohl

1889 births
1969 deaths
United States Navy personnel of World War I
Naval War College alumni
People from Maunabo, Puerto Rico
Puerto Rican people of German descent
United States Navy World War II admirals
Puerto Rican United States Navy personnel
United States Naval Academy alumni
United States Navy rear admirals (upper half)
Recipients of the Navy Cross (United States)
Recipients of the Navy Distinguished Service Medal
Puerto Rican military officers
Burials at the United States Naval Academy Cemetery
Phillips Academy alumni